La Mira is a peak of the Sierra de Gredos range in central Spain. It is located in the central part of the Sierra de Gredos range, a subrange of the larger Sistema Central, in the autonomous community of Castile and León.

The relative prominence, is not that great, as it is connected to Pico Almanzor, the highest mountain of Sistema Central.

The climbing is quite easy: the top can be reached both through the north and the south side. The northern access starts at Plataforma de Gredos, while the southern access starts at Nogal del Barranco.

See also
 Geography of Spain

References

Mountains of Castile and León
Geography of the Province of Ávila
Sierra de Gredos